No. 609 (West Riding) Squadron of the Royal Auxiliary Air Force, originally formed as a bomber squadron and in the Second World War active as fighter squadron, nowadays provides personnel to augment and support the operations of the Royal Air Force. The squadron is no longer a flying squadron, but instead has the role of Force Protection. It is currently based at RAF Leeming, North Yorkshire.

History

Formation and early history (1936–1939)
No. 609 Squadron was formed on 10 February 1936 at RAF Yeadon, now Leeds Bradford International Airport, as the ninth of the 21 flying squadrons of the Royal Auxiliary Air Force. In June of that year it received Hawker Hart light bomber aircraft, which gave way in December 1937 to Hawker Hinds. The first Commanding Officer of 609 Squadron was Squadron Leader Harald Peake, who later rose to the rank of Air Commodore. On 8 December 1938, 609 Squadron was transferred to RAF Fighter Command, but was not equipped with fighters until the introduction of the Supermarine Spitfire Mk.I in August 1939. At this point the squadron was still manned by part-time civilians. Fairey Battle light bombers were used as training aircraft to convert pilots from the fixed undercarriage biplane Hinds to much more modern monoplane Spitfire with its retractable undercarriage.

Second World War

At the outbreak of war, the squadron was called up to full-time service and initially served on defensive duties in the North of England. In May 1940, the squadron moved to RAF Northolt and flew over the Battle of Dunkirk during Operation Dynamo. Around this period, one third of the squadron's pilots were lost over a period of three days.

During the Battle of Britain, 609 Squadron moved to RAF Middle Wallop as part of Fighter Command's efforts to defend the south coast of England, west of London. There was also an advanced flight based at RAF Warmwell. At this time, one third of the RAF's front-line squadrons were from the Royal Auxiliary Air Force. During August 1940 609 Squadron destroyed 46 enemy aircraft, however, by now almost all of the pre war auxiliary pilots were dead or missing. On 21 October 1940 the squadron became the first to achieve 100 confirmed enemy aircraft kills. Boasting 9 'aces', pilots F/L Frank Howell (8 confirmed kills), F/L John Dundas (9 confirmed kills), P/O David Moore Crook (6 confirmed kills) and P/O John Curchin (7 confirmed kills) were among several awarded the Distinguished Flying Cross for their efforts during the battle. A Spitfire that flew with 609 Squadron during this period, number X4590, is now preserved at the RAF Museum, Hendon. Another 609 Squadron Spitfire, number R6915, is preserved in the Imperial War Museum, London. This aircraft scored victories while piloted both by John Dundas and another 609 Squadron ace, Noel Agazarian.

During February 1941 the squadron moved to RAF Biggin Hill. Almost all of the squadron's original pilots were now lost and replacements came from Belgium, Poland, Canada, Australia, France, United States, and New Zealand in addition to those from Britain. During the summer of 1941, 609 Squadron carried out fighter sweeps over France. In November 1941, the squadron was withdrawn from the front line, after 18 months continuous fighting and rested at RAF Digby in Lincolnshire.

While at Biggin Hill, the squadron acquired a goat, soon named William, which became their official mascot. He was awarded an honorary DSO and DFC, and the rank of Air Commodore.

In spring 1942 the squadron moved to RAF Duxford and re-equipped with the Spitfire Mk V. The squadron soon began to replace these with the Hawker Typhoon, which was introduced in an attempt to counter the Luftwaffe's Focke-Wulf Fw 190 fighter. It became apparent that the Typhoon was better suited for low level attacks against ground targets, such as airfields and armoured vehicles. Before this change of focus, 609 Squadron had become the top scoring squadron in the RAF for the period of early 1943. They were the first Typhoon squadron to achieve 200 kills. The squadron also gained new pilots, including the first German citizen to fly with the RAF, Film Production Designer Sir Ken Adam. He and his brother Dennis were the first German-born pilots in the RAF, Dennis joining No. 183 Squadron in 1944, as part of the same Wing (No. 123) that his elder brother was flying in with No. 609 (West Riding) Squadron.

Prior to the allied invasion of Europe in 1944, 609 Squadron was involved with destroying German radar stations on the French coast. In support of the invasion, the squadron's Typhoons were deployed against tanks and other targets using "60lb" RP-3 rockets. The Typhoon proved itself adept at the role of 'tankbuster' and went on to attack the German armoured breakthrough at the Falaise Gap in August 1944. In November 1944 the squadron moved to the Netherlands, followed in April 1945 by a move over the enemy border to Plantlunne, Germany. On some days the squadron flew up to 150 sorties. By the end of the war 603 pilots had claimed some 232 kills for 73 aircrew killed in action.

Post-war period (1945–1957)
After the war, 609 Squadron was stood down, and the name transferred back to the Royal Auxiliary Air Force. In 1946, the squadron reformed at RAF Church Fenton, then moved back to Yeadon. 609 was once again a squadron manned by part-time civilians using front line fighters, this time the Mosquito NF.30 night-fighter and later, when the squadron changed role to that of a daylight fighter squadron, the Spitfire LF.16. In 1951, 609 Squadron re-equipped with jet fighter aircraft, the Gloster Meteor, and moved back to Church Fenton in order to take advantage of the longer runway. At this time, 19 regular squadrons and 10 reserve squadrons of Meteors formed Britains main fighter defence. During the Korean War, 609 and other auxiliary squadrons were called up to full-time service for 3 months.

From 1947 to March 1957 (when all flying squadrons of the Royal Auxiliary Air Force were disbanded), Air Vice-Marshal Geoffrey Ambler, who commanded the squadron just before the Second World War, was the squadron's Honorary Air Commodore. An active 609 Squadron Association was formed after the War and for 21 years was organised by Charles 'Mac' McConnell who had served as an officer during the War. The Association played the lead role in establishing the squadron museum near York.

The modern era (2000–present day)
The latest incarnation of the squadron was formed at RAF Leeming on 1 July 1998 and was originally named the Air Defence Support Squadron, the 609 number plate was granted on 1 October 1999. The squadron is no longer a flying Squadron, but instead has the role of Force Protection, it is employed to prevent or minimise the effects of enemy attack on RAF bases.
The Squadron was deployed to Ali Al Salem as part of Operation Telic from February to August 2003. Furthermore, 15 of the Squadrons reservists were deployed to Al Udeid Air Base, Qatar. Over 50 of the Squadrons reservists were awarded the Iraq Medal.
Since then, several Squadron members have deployed with Regular RAF Regiment Squadrons on operations in Iraq and Afghanistan.

609 Squadron in art
Due to the exploits of 609 Squadron during the Second World War, its aircraft have been depicted in a number of paintings.
These include:
 Southern Patrol, by Philip West, showing both 609 and 152 Squadron patrolling over the south coast of England.
 Spitfire Tally-Ho, by Geoffrey Lea (note that Tally-Ho is the Squadron motto).
 Supermarine Spitfire Mk I, by Philip West.
 Into the blue, by Simon Atack.
 Height of the Battle, by Geoff Nutkins. Showing John Dundas & Red Tobin in combat.
 Lone Patrol, by John Young. Showing Spifire Mk I, X4590 the aircraft now preserved at the RAF Museum, Hendon.
 609 Squadron's 200th, by Geoff Nutkins.
 Typhoon Scramble, by Richard Taylor.
 Typhoon Attack, by Robert Taylor.
 Double Trouble, by Geoff Nutkins.
 Sorbo Leader Attacking, by Alex Hamilton. Showing Pilot Officer N.Le C.Agazarian in Spitfire PR-U R6915.
 Battle above the Clouds, by Geoff Nutkins. Showing John Dundas shooting down German ace Helmut Wick.

Aircraft operated

Commanding officers

See also
List of Royal Air Force aircraft squadrons

References

Notes

Bibliography

Books by members of 609 Squadron
 Bell, George Armour. To Live Among Heroes. London: Grub Street Publishing. . George Bell served as a medical officer with 609 Squadron. This book details the experiences of the Squadron in 1944 and 1945.
 Crook, David Moore (1942). Spitfire Pilot, Faber and Faber. His autobiography.
 Crook, David Moore (1946). Pursuit of Passy, Herbert Joseph. A novel.
 DeMoulin, Charles (1982). Mes Oiseaux De Feu (in French). Julliard/France Loisirs. Belgian pilot of the 609 Squadron (1941–1945), he became Squadron Leader in 1944.
 Translated as Firebirds! Flying the Typhoon in Action. Shrewsbury, Shropshire, UK: Airlife Publishing Ltd., 1987. .
 Earnshaw, James Douglas. 609 at War. Vector Fine Art. .
 Lallemant, Lt. Colonel R. (1962). Rendez-vous avec la chance (in French). Paris: Robert Laffont. Raymond Lallemant was a pilot of the free Belgian forces who flew with the RAF's 609 squadron. The work is written in French.
 
 Second edition as The Story of 609 Squadron: Under the White Rose. London: Crécy Publishing Ltd., 1993. . Ziegler was an intelligence officer with 609 Squadron.
 Waite, Brian (2008). William De Goat. Athena Press. . Squadron Leader Brian Waite was the O.C. of 609 Sqn. (2001–06) and this is his story of Air Commodore William De Goat, DSO, DFC, the extraordinary Mascot of 609 (West Riding) Squadron during the Second World War.

External links

 609 RAuXAF
 Battle of Britain history of No. 609 Squadron
 Battle of Britain pictures of No. 609 Squadron
 Official history No. 609 Squadron
 Current 609 Squadron Website
 No. 609 Squadron living history group
 609 Squadron photos
 Aircraft and marking of no. 609 sqn
 Official Site of the Royal Auxiliary Air Force (RAF Reserves)

Fighter squadrons of the Royal Air Force in World War II
RAF squadrons involved in the Battle of Britain
609 Squadron
Military units and formations established in 1936